Samuel Newton may refer to:
Samuel Newton (18th century clergyman) in England
Samuel B. Newton (1868–1932), American college football coach
Samuel Newton (sport shooter) (1881–1944), Olympic competitor from Canada